Zub is a surname meaning "tooth" in many Slavic languages. Notable people with the surname include:

Alexandru Zub (born 1934), Romanian historian
Artyom Zub (born 1995), Russian ice hockey player
Jim Zub, Canadian comic book writer, artist, and art instructor
Marek Zub (born 1964), Polish football player and football manager
Mieczysław Zub (1953–1985), Polish serial killer 
Ryszard Zub (1934–2015), Polish fencer

See also
Zubov (surname)

Slavic-language surnames